KFAN-FM (107.9 FM) is a radio station broadcasting an adult album alternative format. Licensed to Johnson City, Texas, United States, the station is owned by J. & J. Fritz Media, Ltd.

History
The station went on the air as KBKK on May 21, 1990. On February 8, 1991, the station changed its call sign to KFAN, and on July 16, 1991, to the current KFAN-FM.

The station is often referred to simply as "The Fan."

Some of the past KFAN DJs/Hosts include:

Steve Coffman (deceased)
Ron Houston (deceased)
Rod Herbert.

References

External links

Official website

FAN-FM
Radio stations established in 1990
Adult album alternative radio stations in the United States
1990 establishments in Texas